is a Shinto shrine located in Soeda, Fukuoka prefecture, Japan. Located on the boundary between Fukuoka and Oita Prefectures, Hiko-san has been venerated from ancient times as a sacred mountain. It was also a center of training for the Shugendō sect of Buddhism. The shrine is located on the Fukuoka Prefecture side of the mountain. The Jō-gu is located in the innermost part of the shrine grounds on the top of Naka-dake, the center peak of the three Hiko-san peaks. The sanctuary is said to have been built in 546. The Hōhei-den, a large lecture hall built in 1616, and the Kane-no-Torii, a bronze Shinto gateway built in 1637, have both been designated Important Cultural Properties by the Japanese government.

History
The shrine was originally built in 546 as a center of training for the Shugendō Yamabushi sect of Buddhism. However, the Shugendō temple was abolished by the separation of Shinto from Buddhism, introduced after the Meiji Restoration. Reisen-ji (霊泉寺), the head temple of the Tendai Buddhism, was converted into Hikosan Jinja (英彦山神社). In 1975, it was renamed and status elevated to its present name, Hikosan Jingū. It is the only Jingu in Fukuoka prefecture and is the oldest of three original sacred mountains of the Yamabushi. In the former Modern system of ranked Shinto shrines it was an imperial shrine of the second rank or kanpei-chūsha (官幣中社).

Gallery

See also
Mount Hiko
Shugendō
List of Shinto shrines

External links

Hikosan-jingu Shrine - Japan National Tourism Organization Official Website (in English)

Beppyo shrines

Shinto shrines in Fukuoka Prefecture
Shugendō
Shinbutsu bunri